Quidditch, also known as quadball, is a team sport that was created in 2005 at Middlebury College in Vermont, United States, and was inspired by the fictional game Quidditch in the Harry Potter books by the author J. K. Rowling. Two teams of seven players each, astride broomsticks and opposing each other on a rectangular pitch, compete with the primary objective of passing a ball through the defenders' hoops, while preventing their opponents from passing it through their own hoops. The real-world sport is sometimes referred to as "muggle quidditch" to distinguish it from the fictional game of the books, which involves magical elements such as flying broomsticks and enchanted balls. In the Harry Potter stories, a Muggle is a person without the power to use magic. The sport is played around the world.

Rules of the sport are governed by the International Quadball Association (IQA), and events are sanctioned by either the IQA or that nation's governing body. A team consists of a minimum of seven (maximum 21) players, of which six are always on the pitch: three chasers, one keeper, and two beaters. The seventh position, known as a seeker, joins each team after a time period known as the "seeker floor" (17 minutes under IQA rules). The pitch is rectangular  with three hoops of varying heights at either end (this contrasts with the pitch of the fictional sport, which is oval-shaped). Teams are required to be gender-balanced: each team may have a maximum of four players who identify as the same gender on the field at one time, making quidditch one of the few sports that not only offers a gender-integrated environment, but an open community to those who identify as nonbinary.

To score points, chasers or keepers must get the quaffle—a slightly deflated volleyball—into any of the three opposing hoops, which scores the team 10 points. The keeper is the only person permitted to stay in the immediate area around a team's hoops. To impede their opponents, beaters can use bludgers—dodgeballs—to hit opposing players and temporarily remove them from play. Once hit by an opposing bludger, that player must dismount their broom, drop any ball being held, and return to touch their own team's hoops before re-entering the game.

The ultimate goal is to have more points than the other team by the time the snitch—a tennis ball inside a long sock hanging from the shorts of an impartial official dressed in yellow—is caught. After the seeker floor has elapsed, the snitch runner moves onto the pitch and tries to evade the two seekers. When one of the seekers catches the snitch, that team is awarded 30 points.  If this leads to the catching team having more points overall than their opponents, the game ends immediately with the catching team winning. In the event a team catches the snitch but still trails in points (or is tied for points) the game goes into an overtime period, with the target being the score achieved by the non-catching team plus 30 points. The first team to reach the target score wins the game; alternatively, either team may concede at any time during the overtime period. Matches or games often run about 30 to 40 minutes, but tend to vary in length due to the unpredictable nature of the snitch catch.

Rules vary from the IQA standard in domestic competitions, most notably in the US. In games sanctioned by Major League Quadball (MLQ) and US Quadball (USQ), catching the snitch results in 35 points, which help teams reach a set score, 60 (MLQ) or 70 (USQ) points above the leading team before the seeker floor. The first team to reach this set score wins the game. Additionally, the seeker floor is set at 20 minutes rather than 17.

History
Quidditch has its roots in the fictional Harry Potter sport of the same name. To denote the difference, the fictional sport uses the capitalized "Quidditch" whereas the sport played as per the IQA rules uses the uncapitalised "quidditch". In April 2017 Oxford Dictionaries recognized "quidditch" as a word.

The sport was brought to life in 2005 at Middlebury College in Middlebury, Vermont, by Xander Manshel and Alex Benepe, who later became the first commissioner of quidditch. It has grown into its own separate and distinct sport after ten publications of rulebooks.

After beginning in 2005, the sport grew to the point where, in 2007, the first Quidditch World Cup took place with Middlebury taking the place of the top team. Since then, yearly until 2014, there was a World Cup within the United States, where collegiate and community teams would compete to be the best team. While Canada often sent several Ontario or Quebec teams, and Australia, Mexico and France each sent a team once, the World Cup in its state never saw true international competition. In 2012, the IQA hosted the Summer Games, where five nations sent national teams. Two years later, the IQA hosted the Global Games, during which the United States defeated Australia for the gold medal. There is now an IQA World Cup every two years, though the 2020 World Cup was cancelled and the 2022 World Cup has been delayed.

Since beginning at Middlebury College, the sport has grown through universities such as UC Berkeley in the United States. It soon grew internationally, arriving in Canada through McGill University and Carleton University in 2009.  In 2010, UCLA became the first major university to create a permanent Quidditch pitch, through the generosity of actor-alumnus Matthew Perry. Quidditch began to take shape around the world with teams beginning in Australia, the UK, and France. It soon spread across Europe and the Americas, arriving in Italy, Spain, Belgium, the Netherlands, Mexico, Argentina, and Brazil. There are now active teams in Malaysia, China, Uganda, the Philippines, New Zealand and Vietnam.

In December 2021, it was reported that some leagues involved in the sport, US Quidditch and Major League Quidditch, were planning to change the name of the sport they engage in. The leagues had stated that this was in order to distance themselves from Harry Potter author J.K. Rowling's views on transgender people and related civil rights, that have been criticized by some people as transphobic, as well as the fact that the film studio Warner Bros holds the trademark to the word "Quidditch". Names suggested include Quidball, Quadball, Quickball, Quicker, Quidstrike and Quadraball. In July 2022, the new name of "Quadball" was announced.

Play
Each match begins with six of the starting players (excluding the seekers) along the starting line within their keeper zone with brooms on the ground and the four balls lined in the centre of the pitch. The head referee then calls "brooms up!" at which players run to gain possession of the balls. The snitch goes on the field at 17 minutes, and the seekers are released at 18 minutes.

The play runs rapidly, with quick change-of-hands of the quaffle, because every goal (each being worth 10 points) scored against a team gives that team the ball. Once a point is scored, the quaffle must be given to the other team's keeper, and almost immediately returns to the offensive with the chasers returning to their keeper zone or proper side of the pitch; beaters are not bound to return to their side of the pitch nor exit the opposing team's keeper zone at any point. Games can last any length of time longer than 18 minutes, depending on the skill and endurance of the seekers and snitch.

In the new iteration of Rulebook 10, mandatory handicaps for the snitch runner go into effect if the snitch has not been caught within a certain time. These handicaps are cumulative and remain in effect until the end of the game. Once the seekers are released, the runner must remain between the two keeper zones. If the snitch has not been caught at the 23-minute mark, the first handicap is issued, requiring the runner to stay within  of mid-pitch. The second handicap, at 28 minutes, constrains the runner to keep one arm behind their back; the third and final one, at 33 minutes, restricts them to within  of the intersection of mid-pitch and the sideline opposite the scorekeeper and benches.

The game ends after the snitch has been caught through what is called a clean catch. The catch is determined by the Snitch Referee, The Head Referee, and the Snitch Runner. The team that caught the snitch is awarded 30 points, regardless if they are winning or losing the game. The winner is determined not by the snitch catch, but by the number of points earned throughout the entirety of the game. Depending on the score teams will delay the snitch catch to better their chances of winning. Teams that are losing will defend the snitch by placing themselves between the Snitch Runner and the opposing seeker.

Positions
Chasers are responsible for passing the quaffle and scoring points by throwing the quaffle through one of the opponent's goals for 10 points. When a bludger hits a chaser in possession of the quaffle or the broom that they are on, they must drop the quaffle, remove the broom from between their legs, and touch their own hoops to rejoin play. Chasers are not allowed to interfere with bludgers. Chasers not in possession of the quaffle must perform the same knockout procedure when hit by a bludger, but do not have a ball to drop. Chasers may enter into physical contact with opposing chasers or keepers. There are three chasers on the field for each team, identified by a white headband.
Keepers can be likened to goalies in other sports, and must try to block attempts to score by the opposing team's chasers. The keeper is invulnerable to bludgers as well as having indisputable possession of the quaffle when within their team's keeper zone, an area around the team's hoops. Once outside of the keeper zone, the keeper may serve as a fourth chaser. Keepers may enter into physical contact with opposing keepers or chasers. There is one keeper on the field for each team, identified by a green headband.
Beaters attempt to hit the opposing team's players with bludgers and attempt to block the bludgers from hitting their team's players. Beaters are subject to the same knockout procedure as chasers or keepers when hit with a bludger, but unlike chasers and keepers, they may attempt to catch a bludger thrown at them. If they succeed in catching a bludger, they are not knocked out, and the beater who threw the bludger may remain in play. However, if they attempt to catch the bludger but drop it, they must remove the broom from between their legs and touch their own hoops to rejoin play. As there are three bludgers for the four beaters on the pitch, the fourth, bludger-less beater puts pressure on the team in control of both bludgers (often called "bludger control" or "bludger supremacy"). If a beater is on a team that has no bludgers, they may raise a hand above their shoulder with their fist closed and claim "bludger immunity" to prevent being knocked out by live bludgers as they collect the third bludger. A team that has two bludgers may not prevent the other team from collecting the third bludger. Beaters may enter into physical contact only with other beaters. Two beaters on a team may be in play at a time, identified by black headbands.
Seekers attempt to catch the snitch. They may not contact the snitch but are permitted to contact the other seeker. Seekers are released after 18 minutes of game time. There is one seeker on the field for each team, identified by gold or yellow headband.

Equipment
The game is played with six standing hoops, three on each side of a square pitch. Each player must hold a broomstick between their legs. There are three different types of balls in play, and five in total: the quaffle, three bludgers, and the snitch.

Broomstick

Probably the most iconic piece of equipment for quidditch, the broomstick serves the purpose of being a handicap such as one-handed dribbling in basketball or using only one's feet in association football. The player must stay mounted on their broomstick for every moment of play unless they have been hit with a bludger, in which case the player needs to dismount from their broom and return to their hoops. To be mounted on the broomstick means that the player must hold the broom between their legs and not have it fully on the ground. It can be supported by their thighs or hands equally, just as long as it is not attached to their person nor fully resting on the ground. Because it is a handicap, sometimes players do not play with the brooms.

Players can substitute a variety of objects for brooms depending on the level of seriousness. Many teams play on PVC pipes of about 3 feet or 1 meter in length; these are usually made, but can also be purchased from specialist quidditch suppliers.

Hoops
Three hoops are placed on either side of the pitch of differing heights (and ), placed two broomsticks apart. Chasers and keepers can score by throwing the quaffle through any one of the hoops, from either front or back, gaining ten points for their team per score. Any player experiencing a knock-out effect from either dismounting their broomstick or getting hit with a bludger must touch with any part of their body excluding the broom any one of their hoops before returning to play.

Quaffle
The quaffle is a slightly deflated regulation volleyball that can only be manipulated by chasers or keepers. Used for scoring, it may pass through any hoop from either side. Regardless of which team caused the quaffle to pass through the hoop, as long as it is in play, a goal is scored against the team whose hoop was scored upon, which is counted to be 10 points.

Bludgers
The bludger is a slightly deflated dodgeball that can only be manipulated by beaters. At any given time there are four beaters in play, but only three bludgers. The bludgers are used to hit any other player on the field. Upon being hit by a bludger previously in the possession of an opposing beater, the player suffers the knockout effect. This means they must dismount their broom, drop any ball that they may have been carrying, and touch their team's hoops before resuming play. There is no friendly fire, meaning that bludgers thrown by beaters cannot affect any of their teammates.

Snitch

The snitch is a tennis ball placed at the bottom of a long yellow pouch that is attached to the back of the snitch runner's shorts as if it were a tail. The snitch runner may do everything in their power to protect the snitch from being caught by seekers, for example pushing, running, or even throwing the player's broom away. Only seekers may make advances towards the snitch or the snitch runner, and no forceful contact with the snitch runner is allowed. If the snitch is not caught within a certain period of time, a series of handicaps go into effect against the runner to limit their freedom of movement, one at a time. In most leagues, the game ends when one of the seekers grabs the snitch, awarding 30 points to their team. However, some leagues are tinkering with snitch rules. For example, in 2019, Major League Quidditch made the snitch worth 40 points. Instead of ending the game, a catch contributed to a "set score" that a team must surpass to win.

As of the release of Rulebook 8, the snitch is relegated to playing only on the field in the same fashion as the other players. Previously, snitch runners left the pitch to be pursued by seekers returning to the field after a predetermined amount of time.

Rules
USQ (originally IQA) has released 15 iterations of the Rulebook, each building upon the last. The modern IQA has released 5 iterations of the Rulebook since it split from USQ.

Playing
Each match begins with six of the starting players (excluding the seekers) along the starting line within their keeper zone with brooms on the ground and the four balls lined in the centre of the pitch. The head referee then calls "brooms up!" at which players run to gain possession of the balls. After brooms up is called, the seekers must not interfere with other positions, and wait near the pitch until the end of the seeker floor, usually 18 minutes. The snitch goes on the field at 17 minutes, and the seekers are released at 18 minutes.

Play runs rapidly, with quick change-of-hands of the quaffle, because every goal (each being worth 10 points) scored against a team gives that team the ball. Once a point is scored, the quaffle must be given to the other team's keeper, and almost immediately returns to the offensive with the chasers returning to their keeper zone or proper side of the pitch; beaters are not bound to return to their side of the pitch nor exit the opposing team's keeper zone at any point. Games can last any length of time longer than 18 minutes, depending on the skill and endurance of the seekers and snitch. Many tournaments introduce snitch handicaps, such as asking the snitch to use only one hand, no hands, or remain on the centre line, to ensure games fit within reasonable time slots.

The game is won only after the snitch has been caught cleanly, and the team that caught the snitch is awarded 30 points. The winner is determined not by the snitch catch but by the number of points earned; thus it is not unknown for teams that are losing by a wide margin to try delaying a snitch catch so that they can narrow the opponents' lead, along with the reverse, with the winning team trying to extend their lead.

Fouls and illegal plays
Depending on the severity of the foul, a player found committing an illegal play will result in a blue, yellow, and/or a red card. Cards are issued at the discretion of the Head Referee. If need be the Head Referee may consult with their AR's (Assistant Referees) to determine which card should be given to the offending player.

When a blue card is issued, it is considered to be a non-stacking yellow card, and can either result in being sent back to hoops or spend one minute in the penalty box. When a yellow card is issued, the player must sit in the penalty box for one minute and the rest of the team plays a person down for that minute. If the opposing team scores before the minute is up then the player will be allowed to return to the game. They are still considered off-broom and must tag their team's hoops to resume play. If a player receives two yellow cards, then they are ejected from the game but do not receive a red card. If a player receives a red card, then that player is barred from the rest of the game and the player's team has to continue with a player down for two minutes.

If a Keeper is sent to the penalty box, they must give their headband to another chaser on their team, both teams are required to have a keeper on the pitch at all times.

Contact rules are fairly straightforward and are similar to other contact sports. Tackles are legal between the knees and shoulders. Two-handed tackling is allowed. All tackles must be initiated from the front side of the opposing player. Any back tackles made will result in a yellow card, however, if the player turns their back into the tackle with no chance for adjustment, it is not considered illegal. Players can only tackle other players of their same position (with keepers considered chasers) if they have the ball. Pushes are allowed if the arm is held straight; it is illegal to push if the arm is bent and then extended when pushing another player. Players are not allowed to dive for balls, slide into contact, trip opposing players, or initiate contact around the neck or over the shoulder. If a player is found making any of these offences it will result in a card depending on the severity of the offence.

After several various types of illegal play, after an injury, or after a snitch catch, the head referee will blow their whistle three times to indicate stoppage of play, in which every player must drop in place their broom.

The snitch can no longer leave the pitch and is also subject to 'brooms down' (which is when play stops and no one can change location or headband), but can 'take a knee' by having any part of their body except their feet touch the floor. In this case, the seekers cannot advance towards the snitch at all until three seconds after the snitch is back up – if they do so, they will be sent back to hoops.

Pitch
The quidditch pitch is usually marked with cones or with painted lines, and it is where all play occurs (a rectangle of  around the pitch). Balls are not allowed to be kicked off the pitch under penalty, nor is play allowed in the spectator zones. Players are asked to return to the pitch when play continues out of bounds.

On the edge of the pitch is a penalty box where players who have committed fouls that warrant yellow cards are sent for one minute.

Officials
Each official game requires having several referees present as well as an official snitch. The referees consist of: 
 Head referee, who enforces the rules, takes disciplinary action against players, and is the only official who may directly issue penalty cards;
 Assistant referees, who assist the Head Referee in calling whether players are subject to the knockout effect, watching plays away from the quaffle and watching for balls and players going out of bounds;
 Snitch referee, who watches plays around the snitch runner, including knockouts and potential catches, ruling whether the snitch runner is down, and enforcing snitch handicaps;
 Goal referees, who watch the shots taken towards the goals and ruling whether the quaffle is out of bounds at their endline.

The snitch runner, being a neutral player and assistant referee, may help the referees to determine whether or not the catch was clean.

There is also usually a timekeeper and scorekeeper for each game.

Rules history 
The rules of quidditch have changed significantly as the sport has developed over time. New rulebooks are released approximately every one or two years.

Rulebook 8
The release of Rulebook 8 coincided partially with the reformation of the IQA. As USQ released the rulebook, the IQA chose to adopt the eighth iteration as the de facto international standard where the proceeding rulebook will be released under the guise of the IQA. The changes from Rulebook 7 to Rulebook 8 were minimal except in two areas: blue cards and snitching.

A technical foul results in a blue card on a player where that player must substitute with another player of the same position. The substitution does not, however, result in a power play for the other team, and play is not stopped when this card is rendered. A play may accrue an unlimited number of technical fouls during a match.

Snitching also changed in Rulebook 8 resulting in the deletion of off-pitch seeking. Where before, the snitch would be "released" before each match by running off the pitch during a set amount of time, now the snitch is released to the field, limited to the playing area, at 17 minutes (the seekers being released at 18 minutes). Many NGBs chose to continue playing under Rulebook 7 rules.

Rulebook 9 
The release of Rulebook 9 coincided partially with the reformation of the IQA. As USQ released the rulebook, the IQA chose to adopt the eighth iteration as the de facto international standard where the proceeding rulebook will be released under the guise of the IQA. The changes from Rulebook 8 to Rulebook 9 were minimal.

Rulebook 9 requires that if a chaser or keeper decides to reset the play by throwing the quaffle back to their side of the pitch, there must be a chaser and/or keeper to receive the quaffle. If there is no one to receive the ball, it will be considered a turnover and the offending team will lose possession of the quaffle.

Rulebook 10 
The release of Rulebook 10 coincided partially with the reformation of the IQA. As USQ released the rulebook, the IQA chose to adopt the eighth iteration as the de facto international standard where the proceeding rulebook will be released under the guise of the IQA. The changes from the Rulebook 9 to 10 were minimal.

Rulebook 10 now requires that once an opposing team has scored, the keeper and or point chaser must keep the ball moving forward at all times. The rulebook has become more strict on tackling and cards are given at the discretion of the head referee. In addition, moving screens are illegal. This means that if a person wishes to screen for another player that has the quaffle, the person setting the screen must have their feet planted.

2020–2021 rulebook changes 
The 2020–2021 IQA rulebook is notable for making significant changes to several aspects of the game. The most major changes are chaser positioning when restarting play (after third bludger interference and most penalty cards), two yellow cards no longer resulting in a red card, a new setup for the start of games and snitch catches when the catching team is behind no longer ending the game.

The start setup was altered so players no longer line up on their starting line but instead enter the pitch from the side. One bludger starts in the middle of each team's keeper line, whereas the quaffle and third bludger are placed on the midline. One beater and one chaser from each team are chosen as designated runners who line up on the midline. The other players on the team all line up anywhere on the sideline on their half of the pitch, excluding one chaser who acts as the offensive zone chaser and starts on the sideline in the opponents' half.

In the event a team catches the snitch but this results in them still trailing in points (or being in a tie for points), the game now goes into an overtime period where a target score of the non-catching team's score plus 30 points is set. The first team to reach the target score wins the game, however either team may concede at any time during this overtime period. Catches that result in the catching team leading in points still end the game immediately with the catching team winning.

2022 rulebook changes 
The upcoming 2022 IQA rulebook will add in two-arm wrappings and tackling, allow initiating contact from behind if a player has come to a complete stop and extend the seeker floor from 17 to 20 minutes (bringing it in line with the current USQ/MLQ seeker floor). It also adds other minor rules such as required extra breaks during high heat or humidity, allowing plastic shin guards and metal cleats, penalizing beats thrown to the head from less than 5 meters away and new rules about specific scenarios with regard to resetting and stalled quaffles. 

One additional change was proposed but failed receive enough votes which was a "3 maximum" gender rule that would allow teams to only have up to a maximum of 3 players of the same gender on pitch before the seeker floor (compared to the current 4 maximum of the same gender on pitch at any time). QuadballUK have decided to implement this rule change starting in 2023.

International Quidditch Association

The International Quidditch Association serves as the central governing body for quidditch worldwide and helps to coordinate with national associations around the world through the IQA Congress. Previously, The IQA held a World Cup for qualifying members of the association at the end of every season, the first being held in 2007, ending in 2014 with its restructuring. Now, the IQA hosts World Cups featuring national teams, as well as Continental Games in the years between World Cups.

Each nation in which quidditch is played has or is in the process of developing a national organisation. The job of the national organisation is to organise quidditch within the country, create membership policies for teams, organize referees, snitches, and coaches and be the bridge between that nation's teams and the IQA.

Competitions

International tournaments

IQA World Cup

Previously known as the Global Games and Summer Games, the World Cup is the IQA's tournament for national teams. It takes place every 2 years and any quidditch-playing nation is offered the chance at competing on the world level at this tournament. The next tournament will be held in Richmond, United States in 2023.

The original World Cup was titled "Summer Games" to match the Olympics being held in London, United Kingdom. July 2012 saw 5 national teams from around the world compete in this first international tournament run by the IQA, taking place in University Parks, Oxford, England. The five teams were from the US, Canada, France, UK, and Australia.

European Games

Similar to the World Cup, the European Games is an international tournament open to national teams. Inclusion within the European Games is limited to members of the European Committee (also known as Quidditch Europe or QEurope). The first European Games were held in Sarteano, Italy in July 2015.

European Quidditch Cup

The European Quidditch Cup, also known as EQC and formerly known as the European Quidditch Championship, is a yearly championship tournament for teams in Europe. EQC began first in France in Lesparre-Médoc on 13 October 2012 where a minimal number of teams attended due to the fact that quidditch was only recently introduced to Europe. The tournament quickly grew however and during the 2015–2016 season, Gallipoli, Italy, hosted EQC IV on 16–17 April 2016, with 40 teams attending from 13 countries. The next European Quidditch Cup will be held in Mechelen, Belgium, on 25–26 March 2017, and will see 32 attending teams from 15 countries.

Asian Quidditch Cup
The inaugural Asian Quidditch Cup took place between the 30 and 31 July 2016 in Malaysia. It was held again in 2017 and held biennially to match the World Cup/Regional tournament alternations. The teams that competed at the inaugural Asian Quidditch Cup were the Australian National University Owls (ANU), Damansara Dementors, and Subang Chimaeras. The ANU Owls emerged champions.

Regional or league tournaments

Canadian Nationals
Canadian Nationals is the national championship tournament for Quidditch Canada. The 2014–2015 national championship was held in Burnaby, British Columbia on 28 March 2015. Its precursors, East and West Regionals, were held in Kingston, Ontario and Moose Jaw, Saskatchewan on 1 and 7 February 2015, respectively.

Major League Quidditch

Major League Quidditch (MLQ) was founded in 2015. MLQ features standardized schedules, officiation, statistics, and live or previously recorded footage of all games. The league included eight teams across the United States and Canada for its inaugural season in the summer of 2015. The league expanded to 16 teams for the 2016 season with the slogan "#16for16". For its third season in 2017, the league introduced practice squads behind the 16 teams, as well as developed a policy to allow league official teams to play unaffiliated teams.

QUAFL
Yearly, the Australian Quidditch Association hosts QUAFL (Quidditch united Australian federated league), an all-Australian championship that determines which Australian team is the best. The first tournament was held in December 2011 at UNSW, Sydney and won by the hosts. The second tournament was hosted by Macquarie University and was won again by the UNSW Snapes on a plane. The tournament in 2013 was held at the University of Western Sydney on 30 November and 1 December. The winning team was the Perth Phoenixes. Melbourne Manticores defeated UNSW Snapes On A Plane in the 2014 tournament final held at Macquarie University. The same teams would make the 2015 tournament final, held at Monash University, where the Manticores would once again emerge triumphant. Wrackspurts QC from Victoria took out the 2016 tournament held at the Australian Institute of Sport. Most recently in the 2017 tournament held at the same location as 2016, the Whomping Willows of Victoria (in their first year as a team) took out the QUAFL cup.

Quidditch Premier League

Beginning in 2017, the Quidditch Premier League (QPL) is a league in the United Kingdom that, as of 2019, is split into four divisions and 17 teams.

USQ Championships (US Quidditch Cup)
The US Quidditch Cup (previously known as the IQA World Cup or Quidditch World Cup) is the national championship tournament for US Quidditch. The tournament is a continuation of the IQA's original "Quidditch World Cup", having changed names for the 2015–2016 season and US Quidditch Cup 9. The change came about as the IQA shifted to become solely an international governing body for the sport and USQ took over quidditch governance in the United States. Each year, teams from around the United States compete at their respective regional championships to qualify for the US Quidditch Cup tournament held at the end of the college school year. In the 2017–2018 season, USQ introduced separate divisions for college and community/club teams.

The goal of the USQ Championships is to compete to see which team is the best in the United States. USQ membership policy dictates that any team outside the US will be eligible to compete in this and any other USQ tournament as long as they pay the membership fees in full, but, to date, only two teams outside the US have registered as such: University of British Columbia's A and B teams. This policy, however, has since been discontinued. The first US Quidditch Cup champion, since the forming of a separate USQ nationals, was Quidditch Club Boston (QCB) in 2016.

The regions within USQ are:

Northeast
Great Lakes
Midwest
Mid-Atlantic
West
South
Southwest
Northwest

IQA World Cup (old)
The IQA World Cup is the former "world" championship of quidditch, which was held yearly in the United States. As it was maintained by the former IQA, it was almost a purely US-based tournament, seeing little turnout from teams outside of the country. This tournament was discontinued in 2014 when the IQA took on its new role as an international sports federation, choosing instead to host the then-Global Games now-World Cup as a world championship with individual teams relying on their national governing body for a culminating tournament.

The 2020 Tournament will be hosted at Shawnee Sports Complex in Dunbar WV. (67)

British Tournaments
The British Quidditch Cup was first held in Oxford, England, on 9 and 10 November 2013, and was won by the Oxford University's first team, The Radcliffe Chimeras. The BQC was repeated on the weekend of 7 March 2015 held in Wollaton Park, Nottingham. At this tournament, the defending Champions, The Radcliffe Chimeras, were defeated in the final by Southampton Quidditch Club 1, with Keele Squirrels coming third. In total 24 teams were registered to compete with 23 doing so.

Also significant in the UK are the two regional tournaments – Northern Cup and Southern Cup. Originally devised as independently organised tournaments by Keele University Quidditch Club in March 2014, and the Southampton Quidditch Club the following November, the inaugural tournaments were won by Bangor Broken Broomsticks and Radcliffe Chimeras. The tournaments were then taken over by QuadballUK, to ensure consistency between the two, as the tournaments are now used as qualification criteria for the European Quidditch Cup. The second Northern Cup took place on the 31 October–1 November 2015, and was won by Nottingham Nightmares, who defeated Durhamstrang in the final. The second Southern Cup took place on the 14–15 November and was won by the Radcliffe Chimeras, who defeated Warwick Quidditch Club in the final. The following year, the Velociraptors won Northern and Warwick Quidditch Club Southern. The top three teams from each regional tournament (from Northern: the Velociraptors, Durhamstrang, and Tornadoes Quidditch Club and from Southern: Warwick Quidditch Club, Werewolves of London, and Brizzlebears) qualified for the European Quidditch Cup, which took place on the 25–26 March 2017.

In 2017, the increasing number of teams led to the introduction of the Development Cup, or Dev Cup for short, where teams that did not qualify for BQC could play. The style is a round-robin tournament, leading to all teams playing eight games (in the first one) over two days. The first winners of this were the Liverpuddly Cannons, who won all of their games.

Other long-standing tournaments include the Annual Mercian Cup, a mercenary tournament hosted by Derby Union Quidditch, Highlander Cup hosted by the Edinburgh Holyrood Hippogriffs, Reading University's Whiteknights Tournament, and Oxford's unique Valentines Cup, a fantasy tournament where players signed up in pairs. Since awareness of quidditch in the UK is rising exponentially, every year new tournaments are being devised.

In February 2017 it was announced that a Quidditch Premier League would be established in 2017.

Other large tournaments
Each season, regions generally host one to two larger tournaments, mostly following the North American/European school model of two terms (autumn-winter, winter-spring) where there is one larger tournament per semester in addition to that region's regional championship.

Fantasy tournaments
Fantasy tournaments are tournaments where players sign up individually and are seeded to teams at a drawing by the team captains. Each year, there are quite a few fantasy tournaments, with greater numbers being during June–August during the off-season.

Gender or "four maximum" rule and the LGBT community
Since its inception, quidditch has sought gender equality on the pitch. One of the most important requirements within the sport is its 'four maximum' rule:

In 2013, US Quidditch created Title , a branch of the IQA that actively promotes advocacy and awareness as well as gender equality and inclusivity, whose role moved on to the IQA under its "Initiatives". The sport has also been illustrated to yield a positive experience for athletes of all genders, increased desires for inclusivity and stereotype reduction. Testimonials include: "The gender rule makes playing safe for me. I'm trans and genderqueer, two reasons I never know which team to join ... so having a non-binary option means I don't have to choose."

Variants
There are other variants of real-life Quidditch, notably played in Russia, Kazakhstan, and Hungary amongst other places. These variants often play with rules similar to the fictional sport within the Harry Potter universe but differ wildly from the IQA rules, including: playing without brooms, brooms serving a different purpose, referees throwing balls to act as snitches, differing bludger and beater roles, riding bicycles instead of brooms, etc.

A version of "real life" quidditch is also portrayed in the film The Internship, however it strays wildly from quidditch's ruleset.

Corrigan Quidditch
While Middlebury College certainly began the sporting craze for quidditch, an independent form of the sport originated in the early spring of 2007 on the campus of the University of North Georgia in Dahlonega, Georgia. This version of the sport uses a Flying Disk as its quaffle, dodge balls as bludgers, and a golden-yellow 'super ball' for the snitch. This form of the game (known affectionately as 'Corrigan Quidditch' after its originator, an English professor at the university who taught a Harry Potter class that term and developed the game for tournament play as an outgrowth of that course) does not call for players to hold a broom between the legs. Additionally, all of the playing apparatus is located within the playing pitch (quaffle, bludgers, snitch, beater's bats, and keeper's brooms). 'Corrigan Quidditch', as does the Middlebury version, has its own official rule book but features whimsical offences including a 'Queensbury' (moving both feet whilst holding the quaffle) and an 'Impermissible' (which allows the offended chaser to run with the quaffle (without incurring a Queensbury offence) and make a 'try' at the goals, defended only by the opposing keeper). Play includes non-participating teams who stand around the pitch and take control of both 'bludgering' players as well as 'sending off' the snitch at irregular intervals during play to allow the seekers (who are kept secret during play) to attempt a game-winning catch. 'Corrigan Quidditch' was the form of play originally covered in the world press during that significant summer when the seventh Harry Potter book (and fifth Harry Potter movie) was released. Unlike the world-popular Middlebury version, 'Corrigan Quidditch' remains a local event still played on its originating campus.

Kidditch
Modified rules with less contact have been used for younger (school age) players. These rules include no tackling, modified hoops, and a little lee-way on calls made by referees.

Wheelchair Quidditch
The Australian Quidditch Association has a set of rules for wheelchair Quidditch.

In popular culture
 The main characters of The Big Bang Theory mention playing quidditch.
 Mudbloods is a quidditch documentary on how quidditch began in USA.
 Fly The Movie: Journey To Frankfurt is a documentary following quidditch players on Team UK as they prepared for the Quidditch World Cup in Germany in 2016.
 Courtyard Broomball is a video game based around the sport of quidditch.
 Breaking Dad series 3, episode 4 feature Bradley and Barney Walsh playing Quidditch with the Slovenia national team.

See also

International Quidditch Association
IQA World Cup
Major League Quidditch

References

Notes

External links

IQA website
QUK website
Quidditch Canada website
US Quidditch website
USQ World Cup VI
USQ World Cup VII
Quidditch Post
The Eighth Man

Games and sports introduced in 2005
Quidditch
Sports originating in the United States
Mixed-sex sports
Team sports
Ball games
Articles containing video clips
Harry Potter fandom
Redirect targets of redirected portals with existing subpages